Akeel Henry is a Canadian record producer and recording engineer. He was the winner of the Jack Richardson Producer of the Year Award at the Juno Awards of 2023 for his work on Giveon's "For Tonight" and John Legend's "Splash".

He was previously nominated in the same category at the Juno Awards of 2021 for "Rain" (Trey Songz feat. Swae Lee) and "Spell My Name" (Toni Braxton).

References

Canadian record producers
Canadian audio engineers
Black Canadian musicians
Jack Richardson Producer of the Year Award winners
Musicians from Toronto
Living people